David Hunt Linder (1899–1946) was an American mycologist known for his work on the Helicosporous fungi and his dedications for the advancement of mycological knowledge. He curated the Farlow Herbarium of Cryptogamic Botany at Harvard University and founded a highly respected journal Farlowia.

Personal life

1899: David Hunt Linder was born in Brookline, MA on September 24 . Early on in his life, Linder and his family moved to Canton, MA. He spent most of childhood surrounded by science and nature. His parents owned an observatory, a greenhouse, and gardens of many flowers and vegetables.

1928: Linder married to his first wife, Elinor Alberts, who was an orchidologist at the Missouri Botanical Garden.

1939: After Elinor died, Linder sold the house in Canton, remarried to Dorothy, and moved to a new house in Wakefield, MA.

1946: David Hunt Linder died on November 10, at the age of 47.

Education

Linder obtained his early education at the Noble and Greenough School for Boys in Dedham, Massachusetts.

1917-1921: Bachelor of Arts, Harvard College

Linder entered Harvard College in Cambridge, MA and received his B.A. degree in 4 years. By then, he had already started learning about mycology and corresponding with Dr. William Gilson Farlow.

1921-1922: Master of Arts, Harvard University

Linder began his graduate studies in Mycology and graduated a year later. Upon receiving his M.A., Linder was awarded the Sheldon Travelling Fellowship  that allowed him to explore British and Dutch Guiana, and parts of the British West Indies. This trip resulted in Linder’s strong passions for the tropics.

1922-1926: Doctor of Philosophy, Harvard University

Linder continued his mycological studies under the supervision of two prominent mycologists, Dr. Roland Thaxter and Dr. William H. Weston Jr. Upon graduation, Linder went to Liberia on the Harvard African Expedition. Linder became quite ill afterwards due to the physical strain of the expedition.

Career

After his return from Africa, Linder started his career as an instructor at the Henry Shaw School of Botany at George Washington University and a mycologist at the Missouri Botanical Garden

1928: Linder was promoted an Assistant Professor of Botany at the Henry Shaw School of Botany at George Washington University

1931: Linder returned to Harvard University and became an instructor in Cryptogamic Botany. He also assisted one of his mentors, Dr. Weston, at the Biological Laboratories.

1932: Linder began to work as a curator at the Farlow Herbarium, Harvard University.

1939: Linder and his assistant, Miss Harris, started assembling a card index of 2335 pictures of botanists and mycologists ranging from group photographs to formal portraits.

1943: Linder founded Farlowia, a prestigious quarterly journal that included articles up to 100 pages, exclusively on non-vascular cryptograms and fungi.

Contributions to Mycology

Collections: Linder added about 200,000 specimens to the Farlow Herbarium. Important collections included the Bartholomew Fungi, the Sprague Lichens, Mrs. E. B. Blackford’s fungi, and Miss Lizzie Allen’s paintings of higher fungi, etc.

Publications: Linder produced almost 150 scientific papers on cryptogamic plants and fungi. The most prominent one was probably the monograph of the Helicospous fungi imperfecti  This article contains a total of 161 pages and 31 plates, i.e. figures. Clearly, Linder spent a lot of time describing and illustrating fungal species and genera of this group, all of which produce helicore spores, hence the name Helicosporous fungi. 
Linder published work on other types of fungi as well, such as those from the genera Myxomycidium, Rhizopogon, and Schizophyllum.

Descriptions: Of the Kingdom Fungi, Linder described one new family: Kickxellaceae, 16 new genera, and 170 new species.

Honors

Several fungal taxa have been named in honor of David Hunt Linder including; Linderiella G. Cunn., (now a synonym of Clathrus ) Linderomyces Singer, (now a synonym of Gloeocantharellus ), Aplosporella linderae (Peck) Petr., and Circinella linderi Hesselt. & Fennell. (now a synonym of Fennellomyces linderi 

Mycological Society of America: Linder was appointed the Secretary-Treasurer in 1936-1938, Vice President in 1939, and President in 1940

Fellow of the American Association for the Advancement of Science (1931)

Secretary of the American Society of Plant Taxonomists

Members of various clubs, such as the Torrey Botanical Club, the New England Botanical Club , and the British Mycological Society

Interesting facts

Linder served in the Student Army Training Corps as a chemist during World War I.

Linder was a talented artist and excellent drawer. He drew an uncountable number of mycological illustrations.

References

1899 births
1946 deaths
American mycologists
Harvard University alumni
Noble and Greenough School alumni